is a neighbourhood of Tokyo in Suginami ward, west of Shinjuku in Japan.

Kugayama is a residential community located along the Keiō Inokashira Line. It is served by local and express trains. The surrounding stations are Fujimigaoka and Mitakadai.

Districts of Suginami